Manole Marcus (8 January 1928 – 12 October 1994) was a Romanian film director and screenwriter. Many of the actors who starred in his films won awards for their performances.

Studies
In 1955 he graduated from the National Institute of Theatre and Film "I L Caragiale", and started to make comedy films such as „I do not want to get married” (1960) and "The district of joy" (1964).

Professional activity
His talent as a director started to be appreciated and recognized after the dramatic tone of films: Virgo (1966), The Canaries and blizzard (1969), Power and truth (1971).

The climax of his artistic career came at a time when it was hard to tell the truth easily, (freedom of expression was restricted) and is represented by: Actor and savages (1974) and Operation Monster (1976), a drama and a comedy which sometimes fail to convey emotions through subliminal messages powerful, to make characters. They have impressed both contemporary critics and (especially) the general public.

The 1950s was a difficult period for Romanian film, as filmmakers had to give up most of the "conquests" in terms of cinematic language obtained before the end of World War II. Culture was then subjected to a pseudo-artistic socialist realism, which called for works with excessively politicized topics. In this climate, Marcus made a number of comedy films of lesser value. Towards the second half of the 1960s, the director addresses a more serious tone, more involved, or the (1969) Canary Islands and blizzard movie talks about the price of freedom of political underground mission, pursued by the authorities. The film Canary, whose soundtrack is between Phoenix band's tracks, was banned in the early seventies.

In other films, social and political problem type is solved in line with the ideology of the time. In 1970, Marcus made two films significantly, which were greatly appreciated by the public and critics: (1974) Actor and savages and (1976) Operation "Monster" .

Filmography

 La mere (1953)
 Viața nu iartă (1957)
 Într-o dimineață (1959)
 Nu vreau să mă însor (1960)
 Străzile au amintiri (1962)
 Cartierul veseliei (1964)
 Zodia Fecioarei (1966)
 Singur (1968)
 Canarul și viscolul (1969)
 Puterea și adevărul (1971)
 Conspirația (1972)
 Departe de Tipperary (1973)

 Capcana (1974)
 Actorul şi sălbaticii  (The Actor and the Savages) (1974)
 Operațiunea „Monstrul” (1976)
 Cianura și picătura de ploaie (1978)
 Omul care ne trebuie (1980)
 Punga cu libelule (1980)
 Orgolii (1981)
 Non stop (1981)
 Ca-n filme (1983)
 Mitică Popescu (1984)
 Marea sfidare (1989)
 Vâltoarea (1989)

He wrote La mere – (To the apples) and  Viaţa nu iartă  - (Life does not forgive)  - in collaboration with  Iulian Mihu; Cartierul veseliei – (District joy) - in collaboration with Ioan Grigorescu; Cianura şi picătura de ploaie – (Cyanide and raindrop) - in collaboration with Virgil Mogoş; Non – stop ; Orgolii – (The pride)

As an actor, he played the role of “The painter” in his movie Actorul şi sălbaticii – (The Actor and the Savage)

Awards
Cartierul veseliei (1964) - Award for Best Director, National Film Festival in Mamaia, 1965

Zodia Fecioarei (1966) - Diploma of Honor and the trophy "Dama del Paraguas"

 Puterea și adevărul (1971)- International Film Festival in Barcelona, 1967

The Actor and the Savages (1974) - Award ACIN, 1972 -  Nomination Grand Prix at the 9th Moscow International Film Festival, 1975 and two ACIN awards: Special Jury Prize for Directing and Actor Award Toma Caragiu man we need - Prize ACIN, 1979

Bibliography 
 Cristina Corciovescu, Bujor T. Rîpeanu (1996). 1234 Cineaști români, Editura Științifică, București

References

External links 
Profile at Cinemagia
 Vă mai amintiți de... Manole Marcus, 21 octombrie 2009, Eliza Zdru, Adevărul

1928 births
1994 deaths
Romanian film directors
Film people from Bucharest